Marc López and Gabriel Trujillo-Soler were the defending champions, but López chose to not participate this year.
Trujillo-Soler competed with Guillermo Olaso, but they were eliminated already in the first round.
Jonathan Eysseric and Romain Jouan won in the final 7–5, 6–3, against Pedro Clar-Rosselló and Albert Ramos-Viñolas.

Seeds

Draw

Draw

References
 Doubles draw

Doubles